The Interstate Box Lacrosse Association (IBLA) was a men's semi-professional box lacrosse league based in the United States. From 2019 to 2021, the IBLA served as an official partner of the National Lacrosse League (NLL), operating as a developmental funnel. The league was founded in 2017 to unite regional semi-professional leagues into a system similar to the Canadian Lacrosse Association structure of men's Senior A and Senior B indoor lacrosse teams. As of 2021 there are 52 total teams playing in 17 regional leagues. The Seneca Marksmen are the most recent IBLA champions, defeating the Grand Rapids Grizzlies in Lakeland, Florida on September 19, 2021.

History

2017
Colorado formed the first organized regional box lacrosse league with four teams after initial in-state competition in 2016. Seeing the success of Colorado's competition model, RBLL - Minnesota was formed using the same structure. The RBLL - Portland was also added with the Portland River Monsters and Beaverton Mountaineers, but both teams folded after one season with the first bit of controversy for the IBLA. The 2017 champions were the Parker Rangers, who took down the Hastings Walleye to capture the inaugural league title.

2018

RBLL - New England and RBLL - New Jersey began play on the east coast under the IBLA structure. The midwest was organized into RBLL - Ohio and RBLL - Missouri.  The second league title was awarded to the Cambridge Nor'easters after defeating the Denver Mile High Stars.

2019
The IBLA expanded again, adding new competition on the west coast in the form of RBLL - Arizona and RBLL - California. Additional midwest talent was also brought into the fold with RBLL - Nebraska. The Maine Northmen came out on top in the playoffs, beating the Louisville Canards 17 - 14 in the final game.

2020
Due to the spread of COVID-19, most teams faced shortened season schedules and the league championship tournament location was moved from  Boston to  Pittsburgh. By the end of the summer, 10 regions were able to crown division champions. Teams from these 10 regions were invited to compete for the IBLA Nationals league championship. For group play the teams were divided into the Steel and Maple groups. The San Diego Whalers, Grand Rapids Grizzlies, Mooncrest Munitionz, Aksarben Stampede, and Louisville Canards made up the Steel group. The Maple group consisted of the Maine Northmen, Philadelphia Phunk, Charlotte Reapers, Albany Hyenas, and Minneapolis Wheat Kings.

A league milestone occurred on September 17 with the first IBLA player taken in the National Lacrosse League Entry Draft. Mooncrest Munitionz Forward Larson Sundown was drafted by the New York Riptide in round 2 with the 36th overall pick. Sundown is transferring to  RIT for the 2021 NCAA Lacrosse season, meaning New York will retain his rights through the 2021-2022 season. The 2020 IBLA season concluded with 25 playoff games from September 25 – 27. For the fourth year in a row, the championship matchup was played by two teams having never reached the title game. In the lowest scoring championship game to date, the Phildalphia Phunk outlasted the Minneapolis Wheat Kings 9 - 5 to capture their first title.

2021
2021 saw the return of several teams that were on hiatus in 2020 due to local COVID-19 restrictions as well as continued league expansion. The newly formed RBLL - Louisiana was formed by teams in Baton Rouge and New Orleans, RBLL - Texas placed two franchises in Austin, RBLL - Florida hosted teams in Orlando and Tampa, RBLL - Maryland included four teams, and the RBLL- Empire South formed by splitting three teams off from an RBLL - New Jersey that added two expansion teams. In total, 22 different states fielded an IBLA team in 2021. The 2021 playoffs took place September 17 through September 19 at the 8,178 seat RP Funding Center in Lakeland, Florida. Painters tape was used to line the arena and refs decided that getting paid was overrated. 

Controversy arose in the second of two semi-final nationals games with the Tampa Bay Twisters taking on the Grand Rapids Grizzlies. The game concluded after the Twisters scored a sudden-death goal in second overtime to secure a seat in the finals. The League even published this game result on its social media channels and announcing the final matchup would be between the Twisters and Seneca Marksmen, only to go back just before the final and realize they had miscounted the number of goals scored in the game. As such, under further review, the Grizzlies were awarded the final spot in the finals. Some Grizzlies players having perceived from the errant record-keeping that they lost their semi-final matchup had left the arena after their game and were unable to return in time for the championship game. Shorthanded, the team fell to an overpowering Marksmen team that had not lost all season (regular, postseason, or nationals). It was later revealed that this Tampa Bay Twisters game was not the only game at the tournament to be miscounted.

Teams

Current Team Locations

Current Teams

Association Champions

Rules
IBLA rules are nearly identical to NLL rules with minor adjustments to account for slight arena dimension variations.

Notable League Rules:
 Diving is Allowed
 Face-off clamps are allowed
 Shot clock runs on man-down kill

Awards
 IBLA Top 25 NLL Prospect List
 IBLA National Championship Cup

Notable players
 Isaiah Davis-Allen (Virginia Golden Bears) - PLL (Whipsnakes Lacrosse Club)
 Casey Dowd (Maine Northmen) - MLL (Denver Outlaws)
 George Downey (Philadelphia Phunk) - NLL (New England Black Wolves, Philadelphia Wings)
 Brad Gillies (Maine Northmen) - NLL (Rochester Knighthawks, Halifax Thunderbirds)
 Jules Heningburg (Minneapolis Wheat Kings) - PLL (Redwoods Lacrosse Club), NLL (San Diego Seals, New England Black Wolves)
 Will Jennings (Maine Northmen) - MLL (Boston Cannons)
 Dylan Maltz (Virginia Golden Bears) - PLL (Whipsnakes Lacrosse Club)
 David Mather (Seattle Kings) - NLL (New York Riptide) - Team USA 2015 & 2019
 Bill O'Brien (Philadelphia Phunk) - NLL (New England Black Wolves)
 Bobby Schmitt (Louisville Canards) - MLL (Ohio Machine)
 Tim Semisch (Nashville Ignite) - NFL (Tennessee Titans, San Diego Chargers)
 Chris Shevins (Detroit Hooligans, Minneapolis Wheat Kings) - MLL (Ohio Machine)
 Larson Sundown (Mooncrest Munitionz) - NLL (2020 Draft selection by the New York Riptide with round 2 pick 36)
 Corbyn Tao (Minniapolis Wheat Kings) - NLL (Colorado Mammoth,  Minnesota Swarm)
 Ty Thompson (Albany Hyenas) -  Iroquois Nationals, PLL (Chrome Lacrosse Club)
 Chad Toliver (Louisville Canards) - MLL (Philadelphia Barrage)
 Rachel Vallarelli (New York City Spiders, Cambridge Nor'Easters) - NLL New York Riptide Arena Lacrosse League ALL (Whitby Steelhawks)
 Brain O'Gorman ( Hudson Valley Snappers. Hudson Valley Arsenal)  -HVBLL Mahopac Water Panthers - NLL New York Riptide.

References

Lacrosse leagues in the United States
2017 establishments in the United States
Sports leagues established in 2017